Zaragoza Air Base  is a base of the Spanish Air and Space Force located near Zaragoza, Spain. It shares infrastructure with the Zaragoza Airport. in the past, Zaragoza was also used as an emergency landing site for the USA's Space Shuttle.

Between 1958 and 1992, Zaragoza Air Base was used by the United States Air Force, courtesy of the Pact of Madrid.

References

External links
Zaragoza Airport website
Zaragoza US Air Base History (Spanish)

512 Dragons website

Airports in Aragon
Air force installations of Spain
Installations of the United States Air Force in Spain
Military airbases established in 1954